= Drosophila synthetica =

Genetically engineered fruit fly

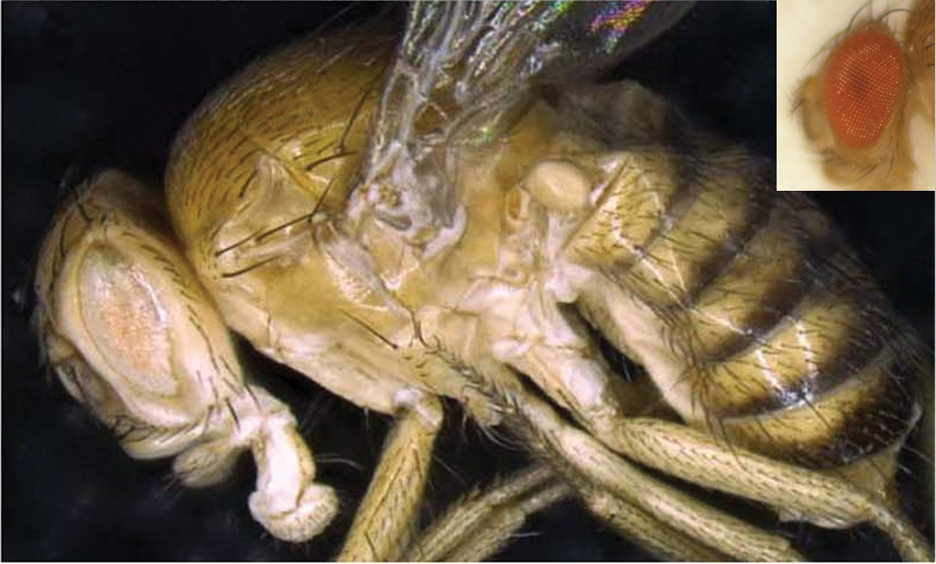
Drosophila synthetica (large) with a photo of D. melanogaster (small) for comparison. The eyes are smaller and do not have red pigments.

Drosophila synthetica refers to a genetically engineered population of the fruit fly Drosophila melanogaster. This population was created under laboratory conditions to ensure it is morphologically and genetically different enough from its wild type to be a separate species. D. synthetica has small white eyes, strongly veined wings, and is unable to hybridize with D. melanogaster. This population was created in 2012 by the Spanish geneticist Eduardo Moreno, working at the University of Bern.

== Features ==
D. synthetica is morphologically similar to D. melanogaster, but differs by having smaller eyes with no red pigments and more strongly veined wings. A digital copy of Drosophila synthetica is exhibited at the museum of postnatural history. https://en.mhpn.ch/pn-synthetica

== Reproduction ==
D. synthetica are fertile and able to produce viable offspring. Hybrids of D. synthetica and D. melanogaster die early in their pupal stage and are unable to develop into adults. As a direct result, the populations of D. synthetica and D. melanogaster are reproductively isolated.
